Illinois Wesleyan University is a private liberal arts college in Bloomington, Illinois. Founded in 1850, the central portion of the present campus was acquired in 1854 with the first building erected in 1856.

History 
The university was founded in 1850 as a private four-year college in Bloomington, Illinois.

Illinois Wesleyan's College of Liberal Arts was formally organized in 1906, and the College of Fine Arts – combining schools of art, music, and theatre arts – was established in 1948.

Illinois Wesleyan offered nursing study in conjunction with the Brokaw School of Nursing beginning in 1923, and in 1959 established the IWU School of Nursing with a four-year baccalaureate program.

IWU operated a School of Law from 1873-1928.

The Board of Trustees took formal action to invite black students to enroll at Illinois Wesleyan in 1867 and women in 1870. The first female graduate, Hannah I. Shur, received her diploma in 1872. Gus A. Hill was the first African-American graduate, earning a law degree in 1880.

The University's first international students, Y. Osawa and K. Tanaka, arrived from Japan in 1889.

Academics 
Illinois Wesleyan is an independent, residential, university with an approximate enrollment of 1,629.
 It offers over 80 majors, minors and programs. Its most popular majors, based on number out of 381 graduates in 2022, were:
Registered Nursing/Registered Nurse (53)
Business/Commerce (36)
Psychology (31)
Finance (28)
Biology/Biological Sciences (26)

The university maintains a low student/faculty ratio of 11 to 1, with an average class size of 16 Also, more than 9 in 10 IWU students receive a scholarship or need-based assistance. Illinois Wesleyan is also a member of the Annapolis Group and has chapters in the prestigious Phi Beta Kappa and Phi Kappa Phi honor societies.

The university consists of the College of Liberal Arts, the College of Fine Arts that includes three professional schools—the Ames School of Art, School of Music and the School of Theatre Arts; and the School of Nursing. Illinois Wesleyan's campus occupies approximately  a short walk north from downtown Bloomington in central Illinois.

Bachelor's degree programs are offered in three colleges:
College of Liberal Arts: organized in 1906
College of Fine Arts: Schools of art, music, and theatre arts organized in 1929, 1946, 1947 respectively
School of Nursing: Established in 1959

Ames Library

Illinois Wesleyan's Ames Library was completed in 2002. It contains over 368,000 volumes spread over five floors. The Ames Library also houses eight sets of stained glass panels originally from Pembroke College at Oxford University. Among the special collections are the papers of former U.S. Representative Leslie C. Arends; the Gernon collection of first editions of detective fiction and mysteries; and the Schultz collection of 18th- and 19th-century British drama, including The Beggar's Opera. Construction cost $25.7 million; Shepley Bulfinch Richardson and Abbot were the principal architects.

May Term
Illinois Wesleyan offers a May Term course option. The university refers to it as a 4–4–1 system. This allows any student who has completed a full course-load in either the spring or fall semesters of that academic year to enroll in a May Term class.

May Term classes last approximately three weeks during the month of May. Students take several hours of instruction in the same course each day for five days each week. This allows the students to immerse themselves in that one topic. At the end of the May Term a student completes the equivalent of a single course during one semester.

May Term emphasizes curricular experimentation, and also offers an opportunity for service projects, study abroad, and internships.

Study abroad
Illinois Wesleyan offers a number of study abroad opportunities, and ranks in the top 40 schools in the nation for students studying abroad. IWU's International Office provides support for over 300 global Study Abroad Options in 70 countries through various institutes such as IES and SIT Study Abroad. Domestically, IWU offers a UN semester, a Washington Semester, and the Associated Colleges of the Midwest Chicago Program. Internationally it offers programs in London and Barcelona. It also maintains a very strong relationship with Pembroke College, Oxford, and traditionally a few juniors can spend a year there as exchange students.

Research
The university publishes several different undergraduate research journals in the fields of political science, economics, history, and English. Perhaps the first of its kind, the Undergraduate Economic Review is a student-managed, open access journal that has published original undergraduate content from students in the U.S. and at least 15 other countries. Its "internal twin", the Park Place Economist, publishes original work of Economics seniors graduating Illinois Wesleyan University. Articles range from basic topical explorations to focused senior research. All published volumes are available online.

The John Wesley Powell Student Research Conference was established in 1990 to provide opportunities for students to present research projects and findings in a public and interactive manner. The Action Research Center was established in 2004 to partner student research and service projects with the wider Illinois community.

Controversy
In November 2021, the American Association of University Professors' governing council sanctioned Illinois Wesleyan for violating standards of academic governance when they discontinued the anthropology, French, Italian and religious studies programs and announced plans to fire six tenured faculty members.

Athletics 

Illinois Wesleyan University participates in the NCAA's Division III and is a member of the College Conference of Illinois and Wisconsin (CCIW). Illinois Wesleyan teams have won 136 CCIW Titles and 9 Division III National Championships. Illinois Wesleyan has produced 135 Academic All-American student athletes since the program began in 1970, a total that is tied for 25th among all participating colleges and universities, regardless of NCAA division.

Illinois Wesleyan University's Division III athletic teams, known as the "Titans," helped found the College Conference of Illinois and Wisconsin (CCIW) in 1946. Illinois Wesleyan was a member of the Illinois Intercollegiate Athletic Conference from 1910 to 1937.

The Titans have 22 varsity teams, 11 men's and 11 women's, with the addition of men's and women's lacrosse in 2014 and 2015, respectively.

Shirk Center

Shirk Center is the university's athletic complex. The two-story  complex was constructed in 1994. A 20,000-square-foot expansion was opened in 2016. The Shirk complex provides a multi-use facility for squash, tennis, basketball, and other indoor sports. It also houses Fort Natorium, the university's swimming center, as well as classrooms and a six-lane, 200-meter track. The Shirk Center also hosted the 2010 & 2011 NCAA Division III Women's National Basketball Championships. The "Shirk" is also the championship venue for the annual State Farm Holiday Classic, one of the largest, coed high school holiday basketball tournaments in the nation, as well as the Heart of Illinois Conference basketball tournament in mid-January.

Division III NCAA National championships
Men's
Basketball – 1997
Baseball – 2010
Golf – 2019, 2021
Women's
Indoor Track & Field – 2008
Outdoor Track & Field – 2008, 2010, 2016
Basketball – 2012

Campus life
The university and Student Senate regularly bring speakers and comedians to campus. There are regularly organized social events both on and off-campus.    Faculty colloquia regularly provide opportunities for intellectual discussion and encouragement.   The campus itself is an arboretum, home to over 1,000 trees from 90 different species.

Residential living and community
All halls are co-ed, all residence hall rooms have cable television and wireless Internet, and the vast majority of rooms are two/three-person units. Dodds Hall offers eight-person suites and Harriet Fuller Rust House offers four-person and six-person suites as well as two eight-person two-story townhouse style suites. Traditional style living is offered in Magill Hall and Pfeiffer Hall. First-year students live in first-year halls: Gulick Hall, Munsell Hall, and Ferguson Hall. Illinois Wesleyan also offers two themed housing communities: Kemp Hall (the International House) and Blackstock Hall (the Arts House). Nearly one-third of the campus community is involved and/or resides in one of five fraternities or four sororities. Students are also able to live in the Gates (est. 2013), and the East Street Apartments (est. 2006) which are modern, apartment-style residences that students can sign as leases.

Campus activities and organizations
There are 200 student organizations at Wesleyan, ranging from the rock-climbing club, the Anime club, to Pi Kappa Lambda (the music honors society).

Lectures and speakers
Illinois Wesleyan co-hosts the annual Stevenson Lecture Series, initiated in 1965 as a memorial to former Governor Adlai Stevenson. IWU co-hosts the Lecture Series with Illinois State University.

Martin Luther King Jr. spoke at the university twice, in 1961 and 1966. In 1966 he came to the university while he was trying to organize in Chicago. There, he said,

And I still have faith in America because I love America and I believe that we will continue to build a coalition of conscience that one day will solve this problem. We sing a little song in our movement and it has been our guiding faith. Sometimes we’ve been facing hooded perpetrators of violence; sometimes we face jeering mobs. Sometimes we face dogs and the gushing waters from fire hoses. Sometimes in crowded jail cells we join hands to sing it. And sometimes in just open mass meetings. But we could sing it as a hymn of faith. We shall overcome, we shall overcome, deep in my heart I do believe we shall overcome.

Media
Illinois Wesleyan has its own radio station, WESN 88.1 FM. It plays a mix of indie, rock, classic, electronic, and folk music.

Wesleyan also has its own television station, Titan TV, broadcasting exclusively to IWU's residence halls.  It broadcasts a collection of movies and campus announcements.

The campus newspaper is called The Argus, published continuously under student supervision since 1894.

Sustainability
IWU's Minor Myers Jr. Welcome Center, opened in 2008, and State Farm Hall, opened in 2013, include geothermal heating/cooling systems. The Welcome Center was awarded Silver Certification as a Leadership in Energy and Environmental Design (LEED) building.

The university's "Think Green" behavioral change campaign encourages community members to conserve resources.

Notable alumni 
 Abraham Akaka, civil rights activist, humanitarian, three decades as shepherd of Kawaiahaʻo Church in Honolulu, Hawaii
 H. Clarence Baldridge, Governor of Idaho
 Chris Bisaillon, wide receiver, College Football Hall of Fame inductee
 Tony Blazine, NFL player and College Football Hall of Fame inductee
 Cherlynlavaughn Bradley, first African-American woman to earn a PhD in organic chemistry at Northwestern University
 Bill Brady, Illinois State Senator, 2010 Republican candidate for Governor of Illinois
 J. Bradley Burzynski, Illinois State Senator
 Alice Sudduth Byerly (1855–1904), temperance activist
 Charlene Carruthers, feminist activist, National Director of Black Youth Project 100
 Alfred O. Coffin, first African American man to receive a PhD in Biology
 Alex Cosmidis, baseball player, scout, minor-league manager
 John E. Cribbet, legal scholar, Dean of University of Illinois College of Law, and Chancellor of University of Illinois
 Tom Cross, Illinois State Representative and House Republican Leader
 Bill Damaschke, head of Creative Production and Development, DreamWorks Animation
 Amanda Dehnert, theater director, musician, and writer; artistic director for Trinity Rep in Providence, RI
 Kevin Dunn, actor, noted for his appearances in Transformers movie franchise and TV series Veep
 Frankie Faison, actor, noted for his appearance in all four Hannibal Lecter films
 George L. Fox, Chaplain's Medal for Heroism recipient
 James Fulkerson, composer
 Glen Gray, bandleader
 Harlan Hogan, voice actor
 Lester Hunt, Governor of Wyoming
 Oliver Lee Jackson, painter, printmaker, sculptor, educator
 Leeya Rose Jackson, art director, ad-woman, and co-host of Borrowed Interest podcast
 Richard Jenkins, Oscar-nominated actor, best known for his roles in The Visitor and Six Feet Under (2001–2005)
 Charles "Buffalo" Jones, Western buffalo hunter who co-founded Garden City, Kansas; attended for two years ca. 1860 but did not graduate
 Tony Kaska, football player
 Tariq Khan, Fox News Academy Awards expert
 Dave Kindred, columnist for Washington Post and Sporting News, elected to National Sportscasters and Sportswriters Hall of Fame
 Sigmund Livingston, founder of Anti-Defamation League
 Scott W. Lucas, Senator of Illinois
 Denny Matthews, radio voice of Kansas City Royals since team's inception in 1969, Ford Frick Award recipient
 Bessie S. McColgin, Oklahoma legislator, first woman to serve in Oklahoma House of Representatives
 Wayne Messmer, longtime Wrigley Field public-address announcer and singer of national anthem
 Jim Molinari, former head men’s basketball coach at Bradley University and Western Illinois University 
 Christina Moore, actress, known for MADtv and 90210
 Opal J. Moore, poet, short story writer, and university professor
 Mary L. Moreland (1859-1918), minister, evangelist, suffragist, author
 Bob Morrow, NFL player
 Gregory Poland, physician and vaccinologist
 Doug Rader, Major League Baseball player and manager
 Robert P. Regan, Illinois state representative and businessman
 George Rock, band member with Spike Jones and His City Slickers
 Edward B. Rust Jr., CEO of State Farm
 Larry Shue, playwright and actor
 Jack Sikma, seven-time NBA All-Star center and Hall of Fame inductee
 Ralph C. Smedley, founder of Toastmasters International
 Sandra Steingraber, author and biologist 
 Thomas Sterling, United States Congressman, graduated from IWU in 1875; served in Congress 1913–1925
 Margaret Ashmore Sudduth (1859–1957), educator, editor, temperance advocate
Elsa Swartz (1874-1948), composer and music educator
 Michael L. Tipsord, Chairman and CEO of State Farm
 Robert C. Underwood (1915-1988), Chief Justice of the Illinois Supreme Court
 Dawn Upshaw, Grammy Award-winning soprano
 Phill Wilson, activist and founder of the Black AIDS Institute
 Bobby Winkles, Major League Baseball manager and College Baseball Hall of Fame coach
 Steve Yoder, college basketball coach

Notable faculty
John Marshall Hamilton, Governor of Illinois
Judy Jolley Mohraz, history lecturer 1972–1974, 9th president of Goucher College
Tari Renner, political science professor, Mayor of Bloomington, IL
Elmo Scott Watson, journalism professor, 1947–1950, specialist on the American Midwest

References

External links 

 
Official athletics website

 
1850 establishments in Illinois
Educational institutions established in 1850
Bloomington, Illinois
Universities and colleges in Bloomington–Normal
Liberal arts colleges in Illinois
Private universities and colleges in Illinois